Moussette is a French surname. Notable people with the surname include: 

Alphonse Moussette (1892–1951), Canadian businessman and politician
Pierre Moussette (1861–1932), French sailor

French-language surnames